Owen Harris is a British TV and film director.

Career
He has directed episodes of Secret Diary of a Call Girl, and Misfits, and the TV movies Holy Flying Circus and The Gamechangers. In 2013, he directed "Be Right Back", an episode of the anthology series Black Mirror, and in 2016 he directed a further episode "San Junipero".

In 2015 he made his feature film debut as a director with the film Kill Your Friends. In 2018, Harris directed episodes of the BBC/Netflix miniseries Troy: Fall of a City.

Filmography
Film
 Kill Your Friends (2015)

Television

References

External links
 

Living people
British film directors
British television directors
1972 births